Dry blowing is a method to extract gold particles from dry soil without the use of water. A machine specialized to use this method is known as a dry blower. It is a form of winnowing.

Methods
One method is to pour dry soil from a height into a pan, allowing the wind to blow away finer dust. The denser gold particles to fall into the pan.
Alternatively, the prospector would use one pan and throw dirt up into the air and catch it.

References

See also
 Sluice box

Gold mining